Absent Fathers is the sixth studio album by American musician Justin Townes Earle. It was released in January 2015 under Vagrant Records and Loose.

Critical reception

Mike Sauve of Exclaim! wrote that "the problem is that Earle's melancholy has taken primacy over his songwriting, which is uncharacteristically generic here, making this subdued and plodding release a career low." Grant Golden of Paste wrote, "For all of the somber overtones to Absent Fathers, there's still plenty of hopefulness within this record... [o]ne can only hope that this landing means that he's as comfortable with self-exploration and transparency in the future as he's been on Single Mothers and Absent Fathers, because if so then the best of Earle may still be yet to come."

Track listing

Personnel
Justin Townes Earle – acoustic guitar and vocals
Paul Niehaus – guitar and pedal steel
Mark Hedman – bass
Matt Pence – drums

References

2015 albums
Vagrant Records albums
Justin Townes Earle albums